The Yilan-class patrol vessel is a pair of heavy patrol vessels of the Coast Guard Administration of Taiwan.

Overview
They have a max crew of 50. The vessels have advanced quieting and interior noise control.

History
The two ships of the class, Yilan and Kaohsiung were commissioned together on June 6, 2015. The original plan was for one vessel to primarily be deployed to the East China Sea and for one to primarily be deployed to the South China Sea.

Vessels

Yilan (CG128) 
The first vessel of the class is named Yilan (CG128).

Kaohsiung (CG129) 
The second vessel of the class is named Kaohsiung (CG129). In June 2020 Kaohsiung and another coast guard vessel detained a large Chinese sand dredging vessel which had been illegally harvesting sand in Taiwanese waters.

See also
 Chiayi-class patrol vessel
 Anping-class offshore patrol vessel
 Miaoli-class patrol vessel
 Cheng Kung-class frigate
 Kang Ding-class frigate

References

Ships built in the Republic of China
Patrol ship classes
Ships of the Coast Guard Administration